The Central Intelligence Agency (CIA) is a civilian foreign intelligence service of the United States federal government, tasked with gathering, processing, and analyzing national security information from around the world.

The National Resources Division is the domestic wing of the CIA. Although the CIA is focused on gathering intelligence from foreign nations, it has performed operations within the United States to achieve its goals. Some of these operations only became known to the public years after they had been conducted, and were met with significant criticism from the population as a whole, with allegations that these operations may violate the Constitution.

1950

Starting in 1950, the CIA researched and experimented with the use of possible mind-control drugs and other chemical, biological and radiological stimuli on both willing and uninformed subjects. The purpose of these programs was to "investigate whether and how it was possible to modify an individual's behavior by covert means."

CIA Director Roscoe H. Hillenkoetter approved the first mind-control study, named Project BLUEBIRD, which was later renamed Project ARTICHOKE.

Crusade for Freedom 

1950 was the beginning of the Crusade for Freedom, a ten-year campaign to generate domestic support for Radio Free Europe (and to conceal the CIA as the primary source of RFE's funding).

Project MK-ULTRA

Project MKULTRA was a CIA program which involved, among other projects, research on the use of drugs in behavior modification. One of the most controversial cases arising from the program was the death of Dr. Frank Olson, a scientist who worked in the Special Operations Division of the U.S. Army Biological Center in Camp Detrick, Maryland. According to the Church Committee, as part of the MK-ULTRA experiments, Olson was given a dose of LSD without his knowledge, and eventually suffered a severe psychiatric response. The CIA sent him to New York to see one of their psychiatrists, who recommended that Olson be placed into a mental institution for recovery. While spending the evening in a hotel room with another CIA employee, Olson threw himself out his hotel room window, plunging to his death. Olson's family members have contested this account. Later forensic evidence conflicted with the official version of events; when Olson's body was exhumed in 1994, cranial injuries indicated that Olson had been knocked unconscious before he exited the window.

1951

Forerunner of Domestic Contact Service/OSINT
This function, run by the Domestic Contact Service (also called the Domestic Contact Division) of the CIA, was legal, as it did not violate the CIA prohibitions of police power or spying on Americans. It was a voluntary debriefing of Americans with useful information. It is now considered part of Open Source Intelligence OSINT.

Office of Current Intelligence
President Truman created the Office of Current Intelligence which was directed by Huntington D. Sheldon. This was a renamed and extended version of the World War II section of the OSS that gave White House and other high-level briefings.

1952-1975
A number of projects, some run by the NSA and some by the CIA, intercepted mail and electronic communications of US citizens in the United States. These programs were, by 1975, discontinued as illegal without warrants. Various interception programs under the George W. Bush administration have been restarted, although these are only allowed for communication with foreign nationals, and claims no warrants are needed under the doctrine of unitary authority.

CIA, and the rest of the intelligence community, receives product from thousands of NSA SIGINT programs. During this same period, CIA received extensive SIGINT on Southeast Asia and the Soviet bloc, and the rest of the world, and used this in preparing analytical products. Among these, for example, are nearly 200 National Intelligence Estimates on Southeast Asia, plus monthly summaries for Vietnam and specific studies relevant to military operations.

Among these were Project SHAMROCK and Project MINARET, in which the NSA, upon request by the FBI and CIA, intercepted communications of American citizens.

The CIA also operated Operation CHAOS with subprograms MERRIMAC and RESISTANCE, which were domestic spying operations designed to detect threats to CIA operations and facilities. Through these programs, the CIA's Office of Security received information from US based informants regarding individuals and groups with anti-war views. 

These programs were judged inappropriate by the Director of the National Security Agency and shut down by 1975.

Another program, HTLINGUAL intercepted physical mail, first simply recording the source and destination addresses on the envelope, and later surreptitiously opening and reading mail. This ran from 1952 to 1973.

1973
"After Colby left the Agency on January 28, 1976, and was succeeded by George Bush, the CIA announced a new policy: “Effective immediately, the CIA will not enter into any paid or contractual relationship with any full‑time or part‑time news correspondent accredited by any U.S. news service, newspaper, periodical, radio or television network or station” At the time of the announcement, the Agency acknowledged that the policy would result in termination of less than half of the relationships with the 50 U.S. journalists it said were still affiliated with the Agency. The text of the announcement noted that the CIA would continue to “welcome” the voluntary, unpaid cooperation of journalists. Thus, many relationships were permitted to remain intact."

1977
According to a 1977 New York Times article, the CIA conducted a covert propaganda campaign to squelch criticism of the Warren Report. The CIA urged its field stations to use their "propaganda assets" to attack those who didn't agree with the Warren Report. In a dispatch from CIA Headquarters, the Agency instructed its stations around the world to:

 counteract the "new wave of books and articles criticising the [Warren] Commission's findings...[and] conspiracy theories ...[that] have frequently thrown suspicion on our organisation";
 "discuss the publicity problem with liaison and friendly elite contacts, especially politicians and editors;" and
 "employ propaganda assets to answer and refute the attacks of the critics. ... Book reviews and feature articles are particularly appropriate for this purpose. ... The aim of this dispatch is to provide material for countering and discrediting the claims of the conspiracy theorists..."

References

External links
 David Price: "The CIA Is Welcoming Itself Back onto American University Campuses" - video report by Democracy Now!

 
United States
United States